Papa lumière is a French drama film directed by Ada Loueilh.

Plot
Charles de Gaulle Airport, in April 2011. Jacques and Safi landed in Abidjan, where they were repatriated urgently. He has old leather tanned by Africa and he is expat life hotelier. She, her mixed race daughter of 14 years, has become accustomed to live with her mother and does not know what to think of this big mouth and crappy father who embarked with him once. Moved to a reception center in Nice, they will learn to look, to know, to love, perhaps. But there Gloria, too, the mother of Safi, left in turmoil of Abidjan and unreachable ...

Cast
 Niels Arestrup as Jacques
 Julia Coma as Safi
 Natacha Lindinger as Elyane
 Bruno Todeschini as Guy
 Jennifer Tie Lou as Gloria
 Venantino Venantini as The hotelkeeper
 Sabine Pakora as The matron
 Sylvie Mauté as the humanitarian

References

External links
 

2015 films
2015 drama films
French drama films
2010s French-language films
2015 directorial debut films
2010s French films